Crypsotidia clytieformis is a moth of the family Erebidae. It is found in Tanzania and Uganda.

References

Moths described in 2005
Crypsotidia
Erebid moths of Africa